The Thailand Volleyball Association is the national regulating body for volleyball in Thailand and a member of the International Federation of Volleyball.

External links
Official Website

Volleyball
Sports organizations established in 1959
1959 establishments in Thailand
Volleyball in Thailand
National members of the Asian Volleyball Confederation
Sports associations